Ronald Clyde Johnson (born September 29, 1949) is a former American politician in the state of Florida.

Johnson was born in Alabama and came to Florida in 1952. He is a business and public relations consultant. He served in the Florida House of Representatives for the 8th district from November 7, 1978, to November 2, 1982, and the 6th district from November 2, 1982, to November 6, 1990, as a Democrat. During his term, in congress, he expressed his support for moderate policies. He often was a swing vote in congress, making him one of the more influential politicians.

References

Living people
1949 births
Democratic Party members of the Florida House of Representatives